Lauco is a comune (municipality) in the Province of Udine in the Italian region Friuli-Venezia Giulia, located about  northwest of Trieste and about  northwest of Udine.

Lauco borders the following municipalities: Ovaro, Raveo, Sutrio, Tolmezzo, Villa Santina, Zuglio.

References

Cities and towns in Friuli-Venezia Giulia